Mohn und Gedächtnis is a 1952 German-language poetry collection by Paul Celan. It has been translated into English by Michael Hamburger as Poppy and Memory. It includes Todesfuge (Deathfugue), one of his best-known and often-anthologized poems.

References

1952 poetry books
Poetry by Paul Celan
German poetry collections